K. K. Jayachandran (born 20 December 1951) is an Indian politician and an ex–Member of the Kerala Legislative Assembly, who represented the Udumbanchola constituency from 2001 to 2016. He belongs to the Communist Party of India (Marxist).

Positions held
 Secretary, C.P.I.(M) Adimali Local Committee (1972) 
 Area Secretary, C.P.I.(M), Rajakkad
 Secretary, K.S.Y.F. Taluk Committee 
 Devikulam Estate Employees Union, C.I.T.U. 
 Idukki District Committee, C.P.I.(M) 
 Idukki District Committee; Chairman, SERIFED
 State Secretary, C.I.T.U.
 Member, C.P.I.(M) State Committee

Personal life
He is the son of Krishnan and Janaki. He was born at Vellathooval on 20 December 1951. He is married to Sreedevi and has two children.

References

Communist Party of India (Marxist) politicians from Kerala
Kerala MLAs 2001–2006
Kerala MLAs 2006–2011
Kerala MLAs 2011–2016
Living people
1951 births